Dorstenia caimitensis is a species of herbaceous plant in the family Moraceae which is native to Haiti.

References

caimitensis
Plants described in 1929
Flora of Haiti
Flora without expected TNC conservation status